Viral message refer to marketing messages that are passed from person to person through their social networks. To create successful viral marketing messages, where success is defined as positive return on Investment, marketers must:

 identify individuals with high social networking potential (SNP)
 communicate compelling information that induces them to purchase the marketer's offer
 communicate information that high SNPs are likely to pass on through their social network

Communication of information in media that can be easily forwarded such as Internet videos, text messages (SMS) can effectively augment word of mouth transmission of the information throughout social networks.

See also
Social networking potential
Viral marketing

Viral marketing
Social networks